Hans Wikne (11 September 1914 – 17 October 1996) was a Swedish equestrian rider who competed in the 1950s and 1960s. At the 1964 Summer Olympics in Tokyo, he finished fifth in the team dressage and 11th in the individual dressage events.

Eight years earlier, Wikne lit the Olympic Flame when the equestrian events were held in Stockholm in lieu of Australia's strict horse quarantine laws which prevented the competitions from taking place in host city Melbourne.

References
FEI 1956 Summer Olympic review.
Sports-Reference.com profile

1914 births
1996 deaths
Equestrians at the 1964 Summer Olympics
Olympic equestrians of Sweden
Swedish male equestrians
Swedish dressage riders
Olympic cauldron lighters